Televiziunea Târgu-Mureș was a local news and entertainment television channel that broadcast in the area of Mureș County.

This channel was launched in 2006, and had some programs in Romanian  (between 18:00 and 22:00) and Hungarian (between 16:00 and 18:00).

This channel was owned by a local media company named Informația de Mureș, who also owned a weekly newspaper with same name. The channel was disestablished in 2009.

It was closed in June 2020, when the National Audiovisual Council decided not to extend its licence.

References

External links
 www.tvmures.ro

Mass media in Târgu Mureș
Defunct television channels in Romania
Television channels and stations established in 2006
Television channels and stations disestablished in 2020
2006 establishments in Romania
2020 disestablishments in Romania